Heath Lake is a  biological Site of Special Scientific Interest (SSSI)  in Berkshire. The SSSI is part of the  Heathlake Local Nature Reserve, which is owned and managed by Wokingham District Council.

It is the only acid lake in the county which retains its characteristic plants, such as alternate water-milfoil and six-stamened waterwort. The banks are peaty and marshy in some areas. There are also small areas of woodland, dry heath and acid grassland.

There is access from Nine Mile Ride.

Fauna

The site has the following animals

Birds

Cormorant
Heron
Mallard
Great crested grebe
Tufted duck
Common kingfisher
Coot
Moorhen

Invertebrates

Brown hawker
Common darter
Black-tailed skimmer

Flora

The site has the following Flora:

Tree

Scots pine
oak
rowan
crab apple
Guelder-rose
alder buckthorn
Salix purpurea

Plant

References

Local Nature Reserves in Berkshire
Sites of Special Scientific Interest in Berkshire